The twentieth series of Geordie Shore, a British television programme based in Newcastle upon Tyne began airing on 29 October 2019 and concluded on 24 December 2019 following ten episodes. After the departures of Holly Hagan, Scott Timlin, Sophie Kasaei from the previous series, it was confirmed that former cast members Abbie Holborn and James Tindale would be returning to the show as their replacements. Filming locations include a trip to the Algarve in Portugal. As well as this, former cast member Adam Guthrie made regular appearances throughout. This series was also the last to feature Sam Gowland and Tahlia Chung.

Cast 
Beau Brennan
Tahlia Chung
Chloe Ferry
Abbie Holborn
Sam Gowland
Nathan Henry
Bethan Kershaw
Natalie Phillips
James Tindale

Duration of cast

 = Cast member is featured in this episode.
 = Cast member voluntarily leaves the house.
 = Cast member leaves and returns to the house in the same episode.
 = Cast member returns to the house.
 = Cast member leaves the series.
 = Cast member returns to the series.
 = Cast member features in this episode, but is outside of the house.
 = Cast member does not feature in this episode.

Episodes

Ratings

References

Geordie Shore
2019 British television seasons